This is the list of äkims of Aqtöbe Region that have held the position since 1992.

List of Äkims 

 Şalbai Qūlmahanov (11 February 1992 – 18 November 1993)
 Savely Pachin (18 November 1993 – 29 September 1995)
 Aslan Musin (29 September 1995 – 3 April 2002)
 Ermek İmantaev (3 April 2002 – 10 July 2004)
 Eleusın Sağyndyqov (10 July 2004 – 22 July 2011)
 Arhimed Mūhambetov (22 July 2011 – 11 September 2015)
 Berdıbek Saparbaev (11 September 2015 – 25 February 2019)
 Oñdasyn Orazalin (25 February 2019 – present)

References 

Government of Kazakhstan